Whitney Hillier (born 1 December 1990) is an Australian professional golfer who plays on both the Ladies European Tour and ALPG Tour. In 2022, she won the Aramco Team Series – Bangkok team event and was runner-up at the Jabra Ladies Open in France.

Early life and amateur career
Hillier was born in Geraldton, Western Australia and plays at Lincoln Golf Club, Torksey. She had a successful amateur career and won the 2008 Australian Girls' Amateur and the 2012 Riversdale Cup.

She was a 2012 member of Golf Australia's National Squad, and finished 3rd at the 2012 Espirito Santo Trophy Amateur Team Championships together with Brianna Elliott and Minjee Lee.

Professional career
Hillier turned professional in 2012 and joined the Ladies European Tour in 2013. In her rookie season, she played in 15 tournaments and recorded a best finish of 3rd at the Allianz Ladies Slovak Open. She ended the season ranked 55th on the Order of Merit to secured her card for the 2014 season.

In 2014 her best finish was tied 8th at the Ladies Italian Open and in 2016 tied 10th at the ISPS Handa New Zealand Open. In 2017, she finished 3rd at the Ladies European Thailand Championship, two strokes behind winner Atthaya Thitikul, and in 2018 she was 4th at the Hero Women's Indian Open. In 2021, she was T5 at the Saudi Ladies International and finished 45th in the Race to Costa del Sol.

In 2022, Hillier won the Aramco Team Series – Bangkok team event, captaining a team with Chonlada Chayanun and Krista Bakker. The following week, she lost a playoff to Tiia Koivisto at the Jabra Ladies Open held at the Evian Resort Golf Club in France, after shooting her fifth career hole-in-one in the second round.

Amateur wins
2008 San Diego Junior Masters, Australian Girls' Amateur
2009 St Rule Trophy 
2012 Malaysian Ladies Amateur, Lake Macquarie Amateur, Riversdale Cup

Professional wins (1)

ALPG Tour wins (1)
2019 Aveo Brisbane Invitational

Playoff record
Ladies European Tour playoff record (0–1)

Team appearances
Amateur
Espirito Santo Trophy (representing Australia): 2012
Queen Sirikit Cup (representing Australia): 2012

Professional
The Queens (representing Australia): 2015, 2016, 2017

References

External links

Australian female golfers
ALPG Tour golfers
Ladies European Tour golfers
Sportspeople from Geraldton
Golfers from Perth, Western Australia
Sportswomen from Western Australia
1990 births
Living people